Encarnação (English: Incarnation) is a former parish (freguesia) in the municipality of Lisbon, Portugal. At the administrative reorganization of Lisbon on 8 December 2012 it became part of the parish Misericórdia.

Main sites
Bairro Alto

See also 
Procession of Our Lord of the Passion of Graça

References 

Former parishes of Lisbon